Liu Chao-ching is a Taiwanese taekwondo practitioner. She won a silver medal in lightweight at the 1989 World Taekwondo Championships. She won a gold medal at the 1993 World Games, and gold medals at the 1990, 1992 and 1994 Asian Taekwondo Championships.

References

External links
 

Year of birth missing (living people)
Living people
Taiwanese female taekwondo practitioners
World Games medalists in taekwondo
World Games gold medalists
Competitors at the 1993 World Games
World Taekwondo Championships medalists
Asian Taekwondo Championships medalists
20th-century Taiwanese women